Anaplectoides brunneomedia (brown-lined dart) is a moth of the family Noctuidae. It is known from only a few localities in the Appalachian Mountains in West Virginia, Virginia, Kentucky, Tennessee, and North Carolina.

The wingspan is about 40 mm. Adults are on wing from June to August.

External links
Moths of Maryland
The Noctuinae (Lepidoptera: Noctuidae) of Great Smoky Mountains National Park, U.S.A.

Noctuinae
Moths described in 1946
Moths of North America
Taxa named by James Halliday McDunnough